Altonio "Tony" Shedrick Jantjies (born 19 April 1992) is a professional South African rugby union player for Alcobendas in the División de Honor in Spain. His regular position is fly-half.

Career

Youth

He played for them at the 2009 and 2010 Under-18 Craven Week competitions, earning a spot in the S.A. Schools side in 2009. He then played for the  team in the 2010 and 2011 Under-19 Provincial Championship competitions and for the  team in 2012 and 2013.

Jantjies was included in the South Africa Under-20 squad for the 2012 IRB Junior World Championship competition. He started the first game of the competition, kicking four penalties and a conversion in South Africa's 19–23 defeat to Ireland, Handré Pollard was preferred to him for the remainder of the competition, but Jantjies did play in two matches against Italy and Argentina, and was an unused substitute in the final against New Zealand.

Blue Bulls

He also scored his first points during that game, scoring a try and kicking five conversions and three penalties to get a personal haul of 24 points in the Blue Bulls' 49–10 victory. He made five appearances in total in that competition, scoring 43 points.

Jantjies made a further five appearances for the Blue Bulls in the 2013 Vodacom Cup competition, scoring 79 points to finish as the fifth top points scorer in that competition.

His Currie Cup debut came later in the same year, when he was included in the Blue Bulls starting team to face  in the opening match of the 2013 Currie Cup Premier Division season.

Eastern Province Kings

Jantjies joined Port Elizabeth-based side  for the 2015 season. He made just two appearances for the Kings during the 2015 Vodacom Cup competition before his contract was terminated on 24 June 2015 following a breach of team protocol.

Alcobendas

Jantjies moved to Spanish side Alcobendas in December 2018.

Personal life

Jantjies is the younger brother of Springbok fly-half Elton Jantjies.

References

South African rugby union players
Living people
1992 births
Rugby union players from Cape Town
Blue Bulls players
Cape Coloureds
South Africa Under-20 international rugby union players
Rugby union fly-halves